Amphitorna olga is a moth in the family Drepanidae. It was described by Swinhoe in 1894. It is found in north-eastern India and China (Jiangxi, Fujian, Guangdong, Sichuan, Yunnan).

Adults are brown, tinged with yellow, sparsely striated with brown. The forewings have a slight white smear below the apex and both wings are crossed by a brown medial curved line, outwardly marked with ochreous grey, this line is sharply bent inwards below the costa of the forewings, and is angled outwards above the middle in the hindwings.

References

Moths described in 1894
Drepaninae
Moths of Asia